Colletes hyalinus is a species of hymenopteran in the family Colletidae. It is found in North America.

Subspecies
These three subspecies belong to the species Colletes hyalinus:
 Colletes hyalinus gaudialis Cockerell, 1905
 Colletes hyalinus hyalinus Provancher, 1888
 Colletes hyalinus oregonensis Timberlake, 1951

References

Further reading

External links

 

Colletidae
Articles created by Qbugbot
Insects described in 1888